Muhammad ibn Aslam Al-Ghafiqi (d. 1165 CE) was a 12th-century Andalusian-Arab oculist and author of The Right Guide to Ophthalmology (Al-Murshid fi ’l-Kuhhl).

The book shows that the physicians of the time had a complex understanding of the conditions of the eye and eyelids, which they treated with many different surgical procedures, ointments, and chemical medicines.

References

.

Opticians of the medieval Islamic world
Oculists
Physicians from al-Andalus
12th-century physicians
12th-century people from al-Andalus
Pharmacologists from al-Andalus
12th-century Arabs